The Darian calendar is a proposed system of timekeeping designed to serve the needs of any possible future human settlers on the planet Mars. It was created by aerospace engineer, political scientist, and space jurist Thomas Gangale in 1985 and named by him after his son Darius. It was first published in June 1986. In 1998 at the founding convention of the Mars Society the calendar was presented as one of two calendar options to be considered along with eighteen other factors to consider for the colonization of Mars.

Year length and intercalation
The basic time periods from which the calendar is constructed are the Martian solar day (sometimes called a sol) and the Martian vernal equinox year. The sol is 39 minutes 35.244 seconds longer than the Terrestrial solar day, and the Martian vernal equinox year is 668.5907 sols in length (which corresponds to 686.9711 days on Earth).

The basic intercalation formula therefore allocates six 669-sol years and four 668-sol years to each Martian decade. The former are still called leap years, even though they are more common than non-leap years, and are years that are either odd (not evenly divisible by 2) or are evenly divisible by 10: this produces 6,686 sols per ten years, giving an average year of 668.6 sols.

A 1998 iteration of the Darian calendar had leap years cancelled if the year was divisible by 100, unless the year was also divisible by 500; adding these rules produces an average year of 668.592 sols, a more reasonable approximation. 

However, these static intercalation schemes did not take into account the slowly increasing length of the Martian vernal equinox year. Thus, in 2006, Gangale devised a series of intercalation formulas, all of which have in common the basic decennial cycle, as shown in the following table:

This extended intercalation scheme gives an average year of 668.59453 days over the 10000 years: this results in an error of only about one sol at the end of 12,000 Martian years, or the year 24,180 of the Common Era.

Calendar layout
The year is divided into 24 months. The first 5 months in each quarter have 28 sols, while the final month has 27 sols unless it is the final month of a leap year, when it contains the leap sol as its final sol.

The calendar maintains a seven-sol week, but the week is restarted from its first sol at the start of each month. If a month has 27 sols, this causes the final sol of the week to be omitted. 

This is partly for tidiness and can also be rationalised as making the average length of the Martian week close to the average length of the Terrestrial week; 28 Earth days is very close to  Martian sols, whereas a month is an average length of  Martian sols.

In the table, the sols of the week are Sol Solis, Sol Lunae, Sol Martis, Sol Mercurii, Sol Jovis, Sol Veneris, Sol Saturni.

The last sol of Vrishika is an intercalary sol that only occurs on leap years, as per February 29 in the Gregorian calendar.

Start of year 
The Martian year is treated as beginning near the equinox marking spring in the northern hemisphere of the planet.  Mars currently has an axial inclination similar to that of the Earth, so the Martian seasons are perceptible, though the greater eccentricity of Mars' orbit about the Sun compared with that of the Earth means that their significance is strongly amplified in the southern hemisphere and masked in the northern hemisphere.

Epoch 
Gangale originally chose late 1975 as the epoch of the calendar in recognition of the American Viking program as the first fully successful (American) soft landing mission to Mars (the earlier 1971 Soviet Mars 3 Landing having delivered only 15 seconds of data from the planet's surface). In 2002 he adopted the Telescopic Epoch, first suggested by Peter Kokh in 1999 and adopted by Shaun Moss in 2001 for his Utopian Calendar, which is in 1609 in recognition of Johannes Kepler's use of Tycho Brahe's observations of Mars to elucidate the laws of planetary motion, and also Galileo Galilei's first observations of Mars with a telescope.  Selection of the Telescopic Epoch thus unified the structures of the Darian and Utopian calendars, their remaining differences being nomenclatural. It also avoids the problem of the many telescopic observations of Mars over the past 400 years being relegated to negative dates.

Nomenclature 
The Darian calendar has been widely imitated. Suggested variations abound on the internet that use different nomenclature schemata for the days of the week and the months of the year. In the original Darian calendar, the names of the 24 months were provisionally chosen by Gangale as the Latin names of constellations of the zodiac and their Sanskrit equivalents in alternation. The 7 sols of the week, similarly, were provisionally named after the Sun, the largest Martian moon Phobos (Sol Phobotis) and the 5 brightest planets as seen from Mars including Earth (Sol Terrae). These were later modified to follow the familiar convention of the Romance languages, replacing Sol Phobotis with Sol Lunae and Sol Terrae with Sol Martis. The Darian Defrost Calendar, however, uses the Rotterdam System to create new names for the Martian months out of patterns relating letter choice and name length to month order and season. The Utopian Calendar, devised by the Mars Time Group in 2001, also has additional suggestions for nomenclature modification.

Mars Julian sol 
The Mars Julian sol count is analogous to the Julian Day count on Earth, in that it is a continuous numerical counting of days from an epoch. The Mars Julian sol epoch is the same as for the Darian calendar, thus Mars Julian sol 0 is 1 Sagittarius 0.

Comparison with timekeeping systems in planetary science 
Since the Darian calendar is designed as a civil calendar for human communities on Mars, it has no precise analog in the scientific community, which has no need to mark Martian time in terms of weeks or months. Two unrelated epochs that have gained some traction in the scientific community are the Mars sol date and the Mars year. In 1998 Michael Allison proposed the Mars sol date epoch of 29 December 1873 (Julian Day 2405521.502). In 2000 R. T. Clancy et al. proposed the Mars year 1 set to the epoch 11 April 1955 (Julian Day 2435208.456). The Clancy Mars year is reckoned from one Martian northward equinox to the next (Ls = 0°), and specific dates within a given year are expressed in Ls. The Clancy Mars year count is approximately equal to the Darian year count minus 183. The Allison Mars sol date epoch equates to Ls = 276.6° in a year that is undefined in the Clancy Mars year count. It converts to 25 Virgo 140 on the Darian calendar and Mars Julian sol 94128.511.

Martiana calendar 
In 2002 Gangale devised a variant of the Darian calendar that reconciles the months and the sols of the week in a repeating pattern and removes the need to omit days of the week. In the Martiana variant, all the months in a given quarter begin on the same sol of the week, but the sol that begins each month shifts from one quarter to the next, based on the scheme devised by the astronomer Robert G. Aitken in 1936.

The following table shows the sol of the week on which each month in the quarter begins.  The first quarter corresponds to spring in the Martian northern hemisphere and autumn in the Martian southern hemisphere.

The leap sol occurs at the end of odd-numbered years as in the original Darian calendar. Since the last month of odd-numbered years contains 28 sols, the following year also begins on Sol Solis, resulting in a two-year cycle over which the relationship of the sols of the week to the months repeats. The sol that is added every tenth year is epagomenal (not counted as part of the week), thus the two-year rotation of the sols of the week is not disrupted. The Martiana scheme avoids the Darian calendar's need to shorten the week to six sols three to four times per year. The disadvantage is that the scheme results in a two-year cycle for reconciling the sols of the week and the months, whereas the Darian calendar is repeatable from month to month.

Other Darian calendars 
In 1998 Gangale adapted the Darian calendar for use on the four Galilean moons of Jupiter discovered by Galileo in 1610: Io, Europa, Ganymede, and Callisto. In 2003 he created a variant of the calendar for Titan.

Important dates in Martian history  

*Mars dates are approximate where the exact (Earth) time of the event is not stated.

The Darian calendar in fiction 
Gangale was inspired to create the calendar after reading Red Planet, a 1949 science fiction book by Robert A. Heinlein.  In the book, Heinlein postulates a 24-month Martian calendar.

The Darian calendar is mentioned in several works of fiction set on Mars:
 Star Trek: Department of Temporal Investigations: Watching the Clock by Christopher L. Bennett, Pocket Books/Star Trek (April 26, 2011)
 The Quantum Thief by Hannu Rajaniemi, Tor Books; Reprint edition (May 10, 2011)
 Thin Air by Richard K. Morgan, Del Rey Books, October 2018.
 Black Helicopters by Caitlín R. Kiernan, Tor Books, 2018

See also 
 Astronomy on Mars
 Timekeeping on Mars

Notes

References

 Bennett, Christopher L. (2011-04-26). Star Trek: Department of Temporal Investigations: Watching the Clock, p. 352. Pocket Books/Star Trek.
 Gangale, Thomas. (1986-06-01). "Martian Standard Time". Journal of the British Interplanetary Society. Vol. 39, No. 6, p. 282–288
 Gangale, Thomas. (1997-02-01). "Mare Chronium: A Brief History of Martian Time". American Astronautical Society. AAS 90–287. The Case for Mars IV: The International Exploration of Mars. Ed. Thomas R. Meyer. San Diego, California. Univelt, Incorporated.
 Gangale, Thomas. (1998-08-01). "The Darian Calendar". Mars Society. MAR 98-095. Proceedings of the Founding Convention of the Mars Society. Volume III. Ed. Robert M. Zubrin, Maggie Zubrin. San Diego, California. Univelt, Incorporated. 13-Aug-1998.
 Gangale, Thomas, and Dudley-Rowley, Marilyn. (2004-07-01). "The Architecture of Time: Design Implications for Extended Space Missions" Society of Automotive Engineers. SAE 2004-01-2533. SAE Transactions: Journal of Aerospace. 
 Gangale, Thomas, and Dudley-Rowley, Marilyn. (2005-12-01). "Issues and Options for a Martian Calendar". Planetary and Space Science. Vol. 53, pp. 1483–1495. 
 Gangale, Thomas. (2006-07-01). "The Architecture of Time, Part 2: The Darian System for Mars." Society of Automotive Engineers. SAE 2006-01-2249.
 Rajaniemi, Hannu. The Quantum Thief, Ch, 12. Tor Books.
 Sakers, Don. (2004-01-01). The Sf Book of Days, pp. 7, 19, 31, 53, 81, 103, 113, 123, 135, 145–149. Speed-Of-C Productions.
 Smith, Arthur E. (1989-01-01). Mars: The Next Step, p. 7. Taylor & Francis.

External links 
 
 The Darian System, Retrieved 1 Dec 2015.

Apps 
 iPhone/iPad: AresCal  Arkane Systems
 Perl: Date-Darian-Mars 0.003 Andrew Main
 Ruby: Darian Mars calendar converter Andrey Sitnik
 Martian Calendar Laurie Harrison
 Mars Weather Dashboard Widget MobiliseMe
 Android: Mars Sky xeronaut.com
 Mars calendar and clock in your browser Interplanetary Immigration Center

1985 works
Mars
Proposed calendars
Specific calendars
1986 introductions